The Seattle Pop Festival was a music festival held at the Gold Creek Park, 16020 148th Ave NE, Woodinville, Washington from July 25 to July 27, 1969. The event was organized by Boyd Grafmyre.

Overview 
The plan for Seattle Pop was to have 25 acts play over the course of three days. Promoter Boyd Grafmyre went to great lengths to make sure performers arrived. He chartered a helicopter to fly The Doors from Seattle’s airport, and rented a Cadillac convertible for Chuck Berry.

Tickets for the event cost $6 for a day or $15 for all three days. An estimated 50,000-70,000 people attended the festival. Seattle Pop was one of the festivals to forgo hiring police or off-duty officers as security; instead, Grafmyre hired The Black Panthers to keep watch.

Because attendance was larger than expected, extra food and water needed to be brought into the venue. According to one source: "Sanitary facilities were inadequate, but every attempt was made to meet county requirements ..." Nearby neighbors complained of traffic and the hippie atmosphere, but Chick Dawsey, owner of Gold Creek, noted that spectators were orderly with very few exceptions."

Performers 
The Seattle Pop's line-up was a mix of established acts, native groups from the Pacific Northwest. Twenty-six musicians and groups performed at the festival. The Doors, Chuck Berry, The Byrds and The Ike & Tina Turner Revue were among the most highly-anticipated acts, but newcomers Led Zeppelin emerged as the highlight. "Sunday night was supposed to belong to The Doors but it was stolen right out from under them by the great English blues group, Led Zeppelin," wrote the Seattle Post-Intelligencer.

List of performers 

 Crome Syrcus
 Bo Diddley
 Flying Burrito Brothers
 Ten Years After
 Guess Who
 Murray Roman
 Albert Collins
 Santana
 Youngbloods
 Tim Buckley
 It's a Beautiful Day
 Byrds

 Floating Bridge
 Charles Lloyd
 The Flock
 Ike & Tina Turner Revue
 Lonnie Mack
 Chicago Transit Authority
 Chuck Berry

 Blacksnake
 Spirit
 Vanilla Fudge
 Rockin' Fu
 Led Zeppelin
 Lee Michaels
 The Doors

See also 
List of music festivals
List of historic rock festivals

References

Music festivals in Washington (state)
1969 in American music
Rock festivals in the United States
Concerts in the United States
Hippie movement
Music festivals established in 1969
Pop music festivals in the United States
1969 music festivals
1969 in Washington (state)